The qualifying rounds for the 2004–05 UEFA Champions League began on 13 July 2004. In total, there were three qualifying rounds which provided 16 clubs to join the group stage.

Teams

First qualifying round
The draw for this round was performed on 25 June 2004 in Nyon, Switzerland.

Seeding

Summary

|}

Matches

2–2 on aggregate; Shelbourne won on away goals.

Skonto won 7–1 on aggregate.

Gorica won 7–3 on aggregate.

HJK Helsinki won 2–0 on aggregate.

Pyunik won 4–2 on aggregate.

Sheriff Tiraspol won 2–1 on aggregate.

WIT Georgia won 5–3 on aggregate.

FBK Kaunas won 6–1 on aggregate.

2–2 on aggregate; Neftchi Baku won on away goals.

Tirana won 2–1 on aggregate.

Second qualifying round
The draw for this round was performed on 25 June 2004 in Nyon, Switzerland.

Seeding

Notes

Summary

|}

Matches

Shakhtar Donetsk won 4–1 on aggregate.

Sparta Prague won 4–3 on aggregate.

Rosenborg won 4–1 on aggregate.

Red Star Belgrade won 5–2 on aggregate.

Gorica won 6–2 on aggregate.

CSKA Moscow won 2–0 on aggregate.

Dinamo București won 2–0 on aggregate.

Maccabi Tel Aviv won 1–0 on aggregate.

Trabzonspor won 4–1 on aggregate.

Club Brugge won 6–0 on aggregate.

3–3 on aggregate; Ferencváros won on away goals.

Shelbourne won 4–3 on aggregate.

Djurgårdens IF won 2–0 on aggregate.

Wisła Kraków won 11–2 on aggregate.

Third qualifying round
The draw for this round was performed on 30 July 2004 in Nyon, Switzerland.

Seeding

Notes

Summary

|}

Matches

Liverpool won 2–1 on aggregate.

Juventus won 6–3 on aggregate.

Sparta Prague won 2–1 on aggregate.

Rosenborg won 5–3 on aggregate.

Bayer Leverkusen won 6–2 on aggregate.

CSKA Moscow won 3–2 on aggregate.

Shakhtar Donetsk won 6–3 on aggregate.

Dynamo Kyiv won 3–2 on aggregate.

PSV Eindhoven won 7–3 on aggregate.

Manchester United won 5–1 on aggregate.

Internazionale won 5–2 on aggregate.

Anderlecht won 3–1 on aggregate.

Deportivo La Coruña won 3–0 on aggregate.

Maccabi Tel Aviv won 4–0 on aggregate. The first match finished 2–1 to Maccabi Tel Aviv but was awarded 3–0 against PAOK for fielding a suspended player.

AS Monaco won 9–0 on aggregate.

Real Madrid won 5–1 on aggregate.

Notes

References

Qualifying Rounds
2004-05